The Force India VJM10 is a Formula One racing car designed and constructed by Force India to compete during the 2017 Formula One season. The car was driven by Sergio Pérez and Esteban Ocon, who joined the team after Nico Hülkenberg left the team at the end of the  season. It made its competitive début at the 2017 Australian Grand Prix.

Competition history

Initially, during pre-season testing the team struggled due to an overweight car and was mired in a very tight midfield battle which included Toro Rosso, Haas, Renault and the Williams team. However, the first 5 races saw both drivers record double points finishes, the only team to do so in 2017. This included a hugely impressive 22 points haul at the Spanish GP where Pérez and Ocon finished 4th and 5th respectively. However, the next race at Monaco GP brought the team's points streak to an abrupt end after Pérez had contact with Carlos Sainz Jr. and Ocon picked up a puncture, though Pérez managed to set the fastest lap of the race to salvage something from the poor weekend. At the next race in Canada, they managed to return to their trend of double points finish. However at Azerbaijan, both drivers collided with each other whilst fighting for a possible win. This caused Pérez to damage his front left suspension and lose his front wing and eventually retire from the race for the first time in 37 races due to the damage sustained, while Ocon survived with a puncture to recover to 6th after a red flag. Ocon scored points at the next 10 races, with his retirement at the Brazilian GP halting his 12 consecutive points scoring streak. After his only retirement of the season in Azerbaijan, Pérez finished in the points for every race, barring the race in Belgium. Although Force India finished 4th in the constructors' standings for the second year in a row, they did score more points then in 2016, with 187, making the 2017 season points tally the highest in the team's history.

Complete Formula One results
(key) (results in bold indicate pole position; results in italics indicate fastest lap)

† – Driver failed to finish the race, but was classified as they had completed over 90% of the winner's race distance.

References

External links

Force India Formula One cars
2017 Formula One season cars